Women artists competing for awards at the 1893 World's Columbian Exposition submitted their work to juries at appropriate buildings. Women artists were represented in the Palace of Fine Arts, along with their fellow countrymen. Women exhibited painting and sculpture throughout the Fair.

The Woman's Building did not have a juried exhibition, but lobbied to have artists of the day submit their work for the "Court of Honor". Women also contributed to the decoration and statuary throughout the Woman's Building.

Women artists in the Palace of Fine Arts
List of Women artist exhibiting at the Palace of Fine Arts, by country.

Austria

Belgium

Canada

Denmark

France

Germany

Great Britain

Holland

Italy
 Maria Martinetti  – painting
 Cora Slocomb di Brazza/Brazza Cooperative Lace Schools – lacemaking

Norway

Russia
D
 Maria Lvovna Dillon  – sculpture
K
Sophia Ivanovna Kramskaya – painting
P
 Helena Polienoff – painting
W
  Helena Wrangel (Elena Karlovna Vrangel)  – painting

Spain
A
 Julia Alcayde y Montoya – painting
 Fernanda Frances Arribas – painting
P
 Maria Pirala – painting

Sweden

United States

Women artists in the Woman's Building
List of Women artists exhibiting at the Woman's Building, by country.

Austria

Belgium

Cuba
M
  Elvira Martinez de Melero  – painting

Denmark
L
   Louise (Queen of Denmark)   – painting

France

Germany

Great Britain

Japan
A
  Giokushi Atomi   – painting
S
 Noguchi Shohin – painting
 Uemura Shōen – painting

Mexico
 Julia Escalante – painting

Russia

Spain

United States

Unknown
 Adelaide Manan – sculpture

Women artists elsewhere at the exposition
List of Women artists elsewhere at the exposition, by country.

France

Sweden
 Anna Palm de Rosa – painting

United States

Gallery

References

World's Columbian Exposition
1893 in art
Lists of women artists
Women
 
History of women in Illinois